Vietnamese people in Russia form the 72nd-largest ethnic minority community in Russia according to the 2002 census. With a population of 26,205, they are one of the smaller groups of overseas Vietnamese. Unofficial estimates put their population as high as 100,000 to 150,000. However, the real number of Vietnamese in Russia is often hard to analyze, due to large number of illegal Vietnamese immigrants living underground across Russia and due to the nature of the Vietnamese–Russian relations.

Most Vietnamese people in Russia have backgrounds as workers and political students being sent by North Vietnam during the Soviet Union, although the first Vietnamese immigrants happened to be the early students-turned war soldiers serving the Soviet Army during the World War II, and are petty entrepreneurs in the retail industry; with Russia's 2007 reform of rules for retail markets, which put restrictions on the proportion of immigrant-owned shops and require Russian-language proficiency examinations as a condition of being granted a work permit and a business licence, many Vietnamese will have to close their businesses and find other lines of work, probably as manual labourers. Students also form another important group; Ho Chi Minh himself studied in Moscow in the 1920s, along with other senior members of the Communist Party of Vietnam. They were followed by an estimated total of 50,000 Vietnamese who studied in Russia during the Cold War. Notable Vietnamese students who have studied in Russia since the dissolution of the Soviet Union include Quynh Nguyen, a pianist from Hanoi who received a scholarship to Moscow's Gnessin State Musical College.

Vietnamese ethnic distribution 
Most Vietnamese live in Moscow and Saint Petersburg. Almost two-thirds reside in Moscow, concentrated in the southern part of the city, near the Akademicheskaya Metro station, where authorities have erected a statue of Ho Chi Minh. Other large communities can be found in Vladivostok and Saint Petersburg, though the community in Moscow is the most well-established and has the highest proportion of long-term residents (those who have been living there for more than 5 years). Assessments of their proficiency in the Russian language vary as well; the Census recorded that roughly 80% could speak Russian, while one article in Vietnamese state-run media claimed that "many Vietnamese find it unnecessary to learn Russian. In fact, many hardly speak the language at all." The Census also recorded that virtually all can speak Vietnamese. 

There have been a growing number of Vietnamese living in Siberia.

There have also been reports about the increasing Vietnamese population in North Caucasus, in particular the Russian republic of Chechnya. This has led to skepticism and suspicion from local Chechens about a Vietnamization attempt of Chechnya, and has several times resulted with ethnic clashes that left several Chechens killed, resulting with deportation of several Vietnamese. The Vietnamese are also increasing their presence in neighboring Dagestan. In 2013, a fight between Vietnamese and Ingush workers broke out after accusation of maltreatment from both sides in the city of Malgobek, resulting with deaths of several Vietnamese.

See also 
 Japanese people in Russia
 Koryo-saram
 Sakhalin Koreans

References

External links 
 Association of Vietnamese in Russia

Asian diaspora in Russia
Ethnic groups in Russia
Russia, Vietnamese people in
Soviet Union–Vietnam relations
 
Vietnamese expatriates in the Soviet Union